Eddy's Bar was a gay bar in Shanghai, China. It opened on Weihai Lu in 1995 and moved to Huaihai Lu in 2002, where it operated until its closure in 2016. Eddy's was the first bar to openly serve Shanghai's LGBT community. Lonely Planet offers the following description: "Shànghǎi's longest-running gay bar is a friendly place with a flash, square bar to sit around, as well as a few corners to hide away in. It attracts both locals and expats, but it's mostly for the boys rather than the girls."

Reception
In 2010, CNN's Robert Schrader described the venue's "red glow [that spilled] out of all the light fixtures, illuminating the Westerners and the Shanghainese who congregate at one of the most welcoming locales in Shanghai". In 2011, Time Out Shanghai called Eddy's a "popular stalwart of Shanghai's gay scene" and the city's "original gay bar".

See also
 LGBT culture in Shanghai

References

1995 establishments in China
2016 disestablishments in China
Chinese companies disestablished in 2016
Companies based in Shanghai
LGBT culture in Shanghai
Defunct LGBT drinking establishments
Restaurants disestablished in 2016
Restaurants established in 1995
Xuhui District